DWFT (104.3 FM), broadcasting as 104.3 Capital FM2, is a radio station owned and operated by the Philippine Broadcasting Service, the broadcast arm of the Presidential Communications Group. Its studios and transmitter are located at the 4th Floor, Philippine Information Agency Building, Visayas Avenue, Quezon City. The station operates on terrestrial radio on Mondays to Saturdays from 5:00 AM to 12:00 MN and on Sundays from 5:00 AM to 9:00 PM, while it operates 24/7 online.

History

1980–1986: DWIM
DWBR started in 1980 as DWIM (then at 103.5 MHz) under the National Media Production Center, headquartered at the Philcomcen Tower in Pasig before moving to Broadcast Plaza (now ABS-CBN Broadcasting Center) in Bohol Avenue (now Sgt. Esguerra Avenue), and then later moved again to its present location at the Government Information and Media Center Building in Visayas Avenue, Quezon City. The station served music and news daily from 5 AM to midnight. Newscasters around that time were Jess Decolongan, Don Lee, and Bong Lapira. Other voices of DWIM included Babs Peña and Manny Freires.

1986–2017: DWBR

It became DWBR (and moved to the current frequency at 104.3 MHz) in 1986, after the People Power Revolution. The station held the tagline: Weaving Beautiful Rhythms. It played old standards music, from the big band era to the Broadway era, playing songs from the 40s to 70s.

In early 1990s, it adopted the brand Business Radio, albeit retaining its music format. Since that time, it covered the latest business stories and issues in the Philippines with its coverage of the Philippine stock market. It also aired various talk programs that discusses relevant matters concerning business, the environment.

It was managed by its active manager Ms. Ma. Julita "Maju" E. Ramos. Regular newscasters included Bon Vibar, Cheryl Buenaventura-Ayuste, Rouella Santos, Alel Auxillos, Shirly Semic, and Edwin Santos. Other voices heard on the station were Manny Carvajal, Fred Patrick, Santi Bautista, Camille Victoria, Dean Bernardo, and George Boone.

In 2014, Broadcaster's Bureau, a weekday morning show, was replaced with Fresh, which played a mix of retro & current music hosted by veteran DJ George Boone.

Business Radio used to operate from 6 am to 10 pm daily, similar to its sister stations DZSR and DZRM.

2017–present: FM2 / Capital FM2
In late-2016, PBS announced that Business Radio will have its name change. First announced as "Radio 2", it was later changed to FM2 to avoid confusion with BBC Radio 2 in the United Kingdom, with the launch date set on February 2, 2017. Prior to this announcement, radio veteran Rizal "Bong" Aportadera, Jr. (Sonny B) was appointed by PCOO Sec. Martin Andanar as the Director of PBS in July 2016. A month later, Carlo Villo (Carlo José) was then appointed by Aportadera as the agency's Deputy Director and head of the new FM division. Villo serves as the program director for 104.3 FM, as well as its recently acquired 87.5 FM.

On January 15, 2017, Business Radio quietly signed off for the last time and went off the air for a week. On January 24, 2017, the station went on air for test broadcast playing the ‘80s and ‘90s music along with pre-recorded teasers carrying the New Republic tagline. Sonny B, Carlo José and George Boone had their warm-up 3 days after its test broadcast.

On February 2, 2017, past 5:30am, DWBR signed on as 1043 FM2. At that time, it extended its broadcast time by two hours, broadcasting until midnight. Despite having a commercial-free, less talk and more music type of programming, FM2 still airs PSAs and public advisories. Its playlist focuses heavily on the 80s and 90s, with a tiny portion of 70s. Since summer of 2017, FM2 signs on an hour earlier.

In almost 9 months under the new format and for the first time in the history of government radio, 1043 FM2 was ranked by Nielsen as the #1 station in the Niche (A, B, and upper C) market.

On December 11, 2017, PBS retired its old callsign DWBR in favor of DWFT as it appeared on its website and now being used on sign-on and sign-off notices. The said callsign change is made to reflect the new branding, serving as complement to the newly launched sister station 87.5 FM1.

Started from August 2, 2019, FM2 began plays the music of 2000s with a new show Friday Y2K. Since then, music from the 2000s and 10 years behind the current year is integrated to its regular playlist.

On February 3, 2020 (one day after the station's 3rd anniversary as FM2), the station was renamed as Capital FM2.

In late June 2022, Friday Y2K was entirely removed from the station.

References

External links
Official Website
Official Facebook Page

Radio stations established in 1979
Business Radio
Philippine Broadcasting Service
People's Television Network